HMS Ulleswater (or Ullswater) was an Yarrow Later M-class destroyer which fought in the First World War as part of the Royal Navy.

She was ordered and laid down in 1916 at Yarrow Shipbuilders, being completed and launched on 4 August 1917.

In April 1918, the ship was assigned to 'Outer Patrol off Zeebrugge' during the Zeebrugge Raid.

Five sailors were reported to have died.

There is a painting of the sinking by the war artist Charles Pears in the Imperial War Museum.

References

World War I destroyers of the United Kingdom
R-class destroyers (1916)
1917 ships